The 2015 Johan Cruyff Shield was the twentieth edition of the Johan Cruyff Shield, an annual Dutch football match played between the winners of the previous season's Eredivisie and KNVB Cup. The match was contested by FC Groningen, the 2014–15 KNVB Cup winners, and PSV Eindhoven, champions of the 2014–15 Eredivisie. It was held at the Amsterdam Arena on 2 August 2015. PSV won the match 3–0.

Match

References

 

2015
Joh
J
J
Johan Cruyff Shield
2010s in Amsterdam